For the 2002 Vuelta a España, the field consisted of 207 riders; 132 finished the race.

By rider

By nationality

References

2002 Vuelta a España
2002